Alfred Wilkinson may refer to:

 Alfred Robert Wilkinson (1896–1940), English recipient of the Victoria Cross
 Alfred Wilkinson (cricketer) (1863–1922), Australian cricketer
 Alf Wilkinson (1881–1938), Australian rules footballer